The 1935 All-Ireland Senior Football Championship was the 49th staging of Ireland's premier Gaelic football knock-out competition. Galway entered the championship as defending champions; however, they were beaten by Mayo in the Connacht final. Cavan won their second title in three years.

Results

Connacht Senior Football Championship

Leinster Senior Football Championship

Munster Senior Football Championship
Boycott of 1935 which leads to GAA's collapse in Kerry for over a year and severely damages credibility of IRA in Kerry caused them not to play in the 1935 Munster football championship.

Ulster Senior Football Championship

All-Ireland Senior Football Championship

Championship statistics

Miscellaneous

 Kerry withdrew from championship due to Boycotts with the IRA awarded their Munster Quarter Final to Tipperary. 
 Navan GAA Grounds become Páirc Tailteann.
 Tipperary end a 13 year for the Munster title winning their first since 1922, their only title between then and 2020.

References

All-Ireland Senior Football Championship